The Musquash River is a river in Muskoka District Municipality, west Central Ontario, Canada, which splits from the Moon River and flows west into Georgian Bay. Musquash is an Abenaki word meaning "muskrat".

Hydrology
Up until 1968, the river was considered to be a continuation of the Muskoka River. It begins just below Moon Chute on the Moon River at an elevation of  where some of that river's water leave south and then pass through the Ragged Rapids Generating Station. Some of the lake's waters leaves at the west via the Go Home River, while the rest exits over the Go Home Lake Dam as the Musquash River.

Settlements
Near the end of the 19th century, a lumber town called Muskoka Mills was located at the mouth of the river.

In popular culture
The Musquash River and Muskoka Mills are the setting for Slaid Cleaves' song Breakfast in Hell, about a doomed lumberjack who motivates his men to break a logjam in 1899.

See also
List of rivers of Ontario

References

Rivers of Muskoka District
Tributaries of Georgian Bay